Iris Ponciano del Río (born 22 June 1995) is a Spanish footballer who plays as a forward for Rayo Vallecano.

Club career
Ponciano started her career at Rayo Vallecano B.

References

External links
Profile at La Liga

1995 births
Living people
Women's association football forwards
Spanish women's footballers
Footballers from Madrid
Rayo Vallecano Femenino players
Primera División (women) players
Primera Federación (women) players